Jerome Carrington (born December 25, 1982), better known by his stage name Rome Cee, is an American rapper from Baltimore, MD. Rome was labeled as one of Baltimore hip-hop’s most promising talents in 2010 with two “FreEP”s and one collaborative record with Justin Ambush, all self-released via his Band Camp page. He garnered local attention after joining with Baltimore label Under Sound Music.    His fourth project, The Extra Mile features Brooklyn Rapper Sean Price  and was voted best album in Baltimore City Paper's 2011 Best of Baltimore issue. In November 2009, Rome opened up for Juelz Santana  at the Velvet Rope in Baltimore City. In 2011, he was featured on The Mid-Atlantic Mic Session compilation with various Baltimore artists.

Early life
Rome's father served in the military and moved the family frequently until finally returning to the family's hometown in Baltimore. Rome attended Walbrook High school and later dropped out.

Discography
Albums
 So Much More (2010)
 Street Scholar (2010)
 Tunnel Vision (2011) 
 The Extra Mile (2011)

Mixtapes
 Ceaser's Palace Volume 1 (2008)

Featured singles

Videos

References

1982 births
African-American male rappers
American male rappers
Living people
Rappers from Baltimore
21st-century American rappers
21st-century American male musicians
21st-century African-American musicians
20th-century African-American people